The term doughface originally referred to an actual mask made of dough, but came to be used in a disparaging context for someone, especially a politician, who is perceived to be pliable and moldable. In the 1847 Webster's Dictionary doughfacism was defined as "the willingness to be led about by one of stronger mind and will". In the years leading up to the American Civil War, "doughface" was used to describe Northerners who favored the Southern position in political disputes. Typically it was applied to a Northern Democrat who was more often allied with the Southern Democrats than with the majority of Northern Democrats.

Origin of the term
The expression was coined by John Randolph, a Representative from Virginia, during the Missouri Compromise debates. Randolph had no respect for northerners who voted with the South, considering them, in historian Leonard Richards' words, "weak men, timid men, half-baked men". Randolph said of them:

John Randolph may actually have said "doe faces" instead of "dough faces": the pronunciation would have been identical, and Randolph was a hunter, sometimes bringing his hunting dog with him to Congress. Ascribing "doe faces" (or "doe's faces") to those he despised would have been Randolph's comment on the weakness of these men.

In 1820 seventeen doughfaces made the Missouri Compromise possible. In 1836 sixty northern congressmen voted with the South in the passage of a gag rule to prevent anti-slavery petitions from being formally received in the House of Representatives. In 1847 twenty-seven northerners joined with the South in opposing the Wilmot Proviso, and in 1850 thirty-five supported a stronger fugitive slave law. By 1854 the South had changed its position on the Missouri Compromise and fifty-eight northerners supported its repeal in the Kansas–Nebraska Act.

The 1850s
While the term originated in the House, doughfaces eventually had their greatest influence in the United States Senate. In the House the greater growth of the northern population gave it a greater proportion of votes, but in the Senate the even balance of slave and free states required that only a few northerners needed to support the South in order to hold the House in check. The clearest case came in the Wilmot Proviso votes of 1846 and 1847 when the Senate rejected the Proviso after its passage in the House.

Many Southerners still looked at these doughfaces from the same perspective as Randolph—weak men who, without any firm moral commitment to their cause other than political expediency, could prove at some critical point in the future to be unreliable. Richards has classified 320 congressmen in the period from 1820 to 1860 as doughfaces. The two U.S. Presidents preceding Abraham Lincoln, Franklin Pierce and James Buchanan, were both commonly referred to as doughfaces. Stephen A. Douglas was severely criticized by Lincoln as the "worst doughface of them all", even though he broke with his party over the Lecompton Constitution for Kansas in 1857. Other such doughfaces were Charles G. Atherton, the author of the gag rule, and Jesse D. Bright, the only northern senator expelled for treason during the Civil War.

The ultimate weakness of the doughfaces, from a Southern perspective, came over the issue of popular sovereignty. At the time of the Kansas-Nebraska Act, popular sovereignty was accepted by both the northern and southern Democrats as the proper states' rights position. It protected against federal consolidation and insured the equality of the states to compete in the territories. Douglas and many northern Democrats remained consistent through 1860 in their support for popular sovereignty. Southerners, on the other hand, saw the increasing strength of the anti-slavery movement in the North and by the late 1850s were no longer content simply to rely on preventing the Federal government from interfering in the territories. They now insisted on Federal intervention to protect slavery in the territories and prevent any decision on slavery until a territory prepared a constitution as part of an application for statehood. Northern Democrats such as Douglas could not go that far with the South. The doughface, as an agent for sectional compromise, had outlived his usefulness.

Modern usage

In Arthur M. Schlesinger, Jr.'s book The Vital Center, he applied the term to modern liberalism in the United States, referring to the part of the movement perceived as practicing appeasement toward Joseph Stalin's Soviet Union.

See also
 Copperhead (politics)
 Origins of the American Civil War

Notes

References
 Morrison, Michael A. Slavery and the American West: The Eclipse of Manifest Destiny and the Coming of the Civil War. (1997) .
 Richards, Leonard L. The Slave Power: The Free North and Southern Domination 1780–1860. (2000)

External links
 The Northern Doughface: A Case Study in Historical Relevance
 A Presidential Doughface

1850s in the United States
Politics of the American Civil War
Slavery in the United States